The Shire of Nungarin is a local government area in the Wheatbelt region of Western Australia, and with a population of 257 as at the , is one of the nation's smallest.

History

Initially, Nungarin was governed by the Kellerberrin Road Board. In 1911, responsibility for the area was transferred to the Merredin Road Board.

The Shire of Nungarin originated as the Nungarin Road District, which was gazetted on 24 March 1921. It was originally much larger, extending north into what  is now the Shire of Mount Marshall until losing a section to that road board on 6 July 1923.

In 1933, it included the Bonnie Rock, Campion, Lake Brown, Mukinbudin and Wilgoyne districts, with an area of 1708 square miles. In that year, it faced pressure to relocate the board seat to Mukinbudin as a more central location; however, instead, the Nungarin Road District was split into two and the Mukinbudin Road District formed on 1 September 1933, resulting in the Nungarin district losing over three quarters of its land area.

On 1 July 1961, it became the Shire of Nungarin under the Local Government Act 1960, which reformed all remaining road districts into shires.

Wards
The Shire has been divided into 3 wards. Prior to the elections in May 2003, there were 7 wards.

 Central Ward (3 councillors)
 Kwelkan/Danberrin/Elabbin Ward (2 councillors)
 Mangowine/Campion/Knungajin Ward (2 councillors)

Towns and localities
The towns and localities of the Shire of Nungarin with population and size figures based on the most recent Australian census:

Heritage-listed places

As of 2023, 64 places are heritage-listed in the Shire of Nungarin, of which eight are on the State Register of Heritage Places, among them the Mangowine Homestead.

References

External links
 
 Nungarin Community Resource Centre

Nungarin
Nungarin, Western Australia